The 2010–11 season was Berwick Rangers's sixth consecutive season in the Scottish Third Division, having been relegated from the Scottish Second Division at the end of the 2004–05 season. Berwick also competed in the Challenge Cup, League Cup and the Scottish Cup.

Summary
Berwick finished sixth in the Third Division. They reached the second of the Challenge Cup, the first round of the League Cup and the fourth round of the Scottish Cup, losing to eventual winners Celtic.

Results & fixtures

Scottish Third Division

Scottish Challenge Cup

Scottish League Cup

Scottish Cup

Player statistics

Squad

League table

References

Berwick Rangers F.C. seasons
Berwick Rangers